Tatar (also, Dagdaganly-Tatar, Kara-Tatar, and Tatar, Razvaliny) is a village in the Qubadli Rayon of Azerbaijan.

References 

Populated places in Qubadli District